Khalid Khannouchi (born September 12, 1971) is a retired American marathoner. He was born in Meknes, Morocco. He is the former world record holder for the marathon and held the former road world best for the 20 km distance. He is one of only five men to break the marathon world record more than once, and one of only five to break their own marathon world record (the others are Jim Peters, Derek Clayton, Eliud Kipchoge, and Haile Gebrselassie).

Khalid fell out with the Moroccan athletics federation over training expenses and moved to Brooklyn, New York City in 1992 with three of his friends. He married American Sandra Inoa in 1996, who coached him and acted as his agent. They set up home in Ossining, New York. He became a naturalized citizen of the United States on May 2, 2000.

, Khalid holds the American record for the marathon, with a time of 2:05:38 at the London Marathon in 2002.

Khannouchi officially retired on March 27, 2012 due to recurring foot injuries since 2003. Khannouchi stated "It was really my feet that betrayed me. Every time I go and try to push hard, I get the pain and soreness again. I can't train hard and if you can't train at a certain level where you can be competitive it's not worth it to keep wasting time."

Achievements
 1993
 World Student Games, winner of the men's 5000 metres in Buffalo.
 1997
 Cobán Half Marathon (Guatemala), winner (1:04:30).
 Chicago Marathon, winner (2:07:10), at that time the fastest debut marathon in history and the fourth fastest marathon of all time.
 1998
 Chicago Marathon, second place (2:07:19)
 Peachtree Road Race 10k, winner (27:47)
 Falmouth Road Race 7.1 miles, winner (31:48)
 New Haven 20K, winner in a world road record (57:37)
 1999
 Chicago Marathon, winner in world record time (2:05:42)
 Peachtree Road Race 10k, winner (27:45)
 2000
 London Marathon, third place (2:08:36)
 Chicago Marathon, winner in a new American record (2:07:01)
 2002
 London Marathon, winner in world record time (2:05:38)
 Chicago Marathon, winner (2:05:56), becoming the first man in history to break 2:06 twice in one year
 Ranked as the number #1 marathoner in the world by Track & Field News and their American Athlete of the Year.
 2004
 Chicago Marathon, fifth place (2:08:44)
 2006
 London Marathon, 4th place (2:07:04), coming back from a long period of injury.
 2007
 London Marathon, did not finish.
 United States Olympic Marathon Trials in New York City, 4th place (2:12:34)

Khannouchi was the first marathoner to break 2:06:00. However, he lost the world record to Paul Tergat on September 28, 2003.

Personal bests

References

External links
 
 Khalid Khannouchi Profile at All-Athletics.com

Audio interview
 TheFinalSprint.com's 5/18/07 interview with Khalid Khannouchi before his NYC racing debut

1971 births
Living people
Moroccan emigrants to the United States
American male long-distance runners
American male marathon runners
Moroccan male long-distance runners
Moroccan male marathon runners
London Marathon male winners
World record setters in athletics (track and field)
People from Meknes
People from Ossining, New York
Chicago Marathon male winners
Universiade medalists in athletics (track and field)
Recipients of the Association of International Marathons and Distance Races Best Marathon Runner Award
Universiade gold medalists for Morocco
Medalists at the 1993 Summer Universiade